Darwin Darinel Pinzón Camaño (born 2 April 1994) is a Panamanian footballer who currently plays as a right midfielder for Panamanian club Sporting San Miguelito.

Club career
In July 2015, Pinzón reportedly joined Spanish Third Division side Jumilla, but was denied a work permit and returned to Sporting San Miguelito in September 2015.

International career
He played for Panama at the 2011 FIFA U-17 World Cup in Mexico.

Pinzón made a remarkable official début with the senior national team on 21 August 2014 against Cuba (4–0), as he scored twice in this match. He also scored at his unofficial (not FIFA-recognized) international début, against Guyana (2–0) in 2012.

Honours
San Miguelito
Liga Panameña de Fútbol (1): Clausura 2013

References

External links
 

1994 births
Living people
Association football midfielders
Panamanian footballers
Panama international footballers
Sporting San Miguelito players
2014 Copa Centroamericana players
2015 CONCACAF Gold Cup players